This is a list of books that focus on the study of Shinto.

General
Hori, Ichiro (1994). Folk Religion in Japan: Continuity and Change. University of Chicago Press. 
Evans, Ann Llewellyn (2002). Shinto Norito: A Book of Prayers. Trafford Publishing. 
Littleton, C. Scott (2002). Understanding Shinto. Duncan Baird Publisher. 
Hay, Jeff (2006). Shinto. Greenhaven Press, Detroit, Michigan. 
Ono, Sokyo and William P. Woodard (2006). Shinto: The Kami Way. Tuttle Publishing. 
Breen, John and Mark Teeuwen (2010). A New History of Shinto. Wiley-Blackwell. 
Rankin, Aidan (2011). Shinto: A Celebration of Life. Mantra Books. 
Yamakage, Motohisa (2012). The Essence of Shinto: Japan's Spiritual Heart. Kodansha International. 
Imaizumi, Yoshiko. (2013). Sacred Space in the Modern City: The Fractured Pasts of Meiji Shrine, 1912-1958. Brill Publishers. 
Hardacre, Helen (2016). Shinto: A History. Oxford University Press. 
Miller, Vincent (2018). Shinto - The Way of Gods: Introduction to the Traditional Religion of Japan. CreateSpace Independent Publishing Platform.

Specialized
Nelson, John K. (1996). A Year in the Life of a Shinto Shrine. University of Washington Press. 
Cali, Joseph and John Dougill (2012). Shinto Shrines: A Guide to the Sacred Sites of Japan’s Ancient Religion. Latitude 20. 
Heldt, Gustav (2014). The Kojiki: An Account of Ancient Matters. Columbia University Press.

Bloomsbury Shinto Studies
Rambelli, Fabio. (2018). The Sea and the Sacred in Japan: Aspects of Maritime Religion. Bloomsbury Academic. 
Rots, Aike P. (2019). Shinto, Nature and Ideology in Contemporary Japan: Making Sacred Forests. Bloomsbury Academic.

References

Shinto literature
Lists of books about religion
Books